Warstein is a municipality with town status in the district of Soest, in North Rhine-Westphalia, Germany. It is located at the north end of Sauerland.

Geography

Warstein is located north of the Arnsberger Wald (forest) at a brook called Wäster. The area south of the city is mostly forested; the lightly forested Haarstrang mountain is to the north. The river Möhne flows between these two areas.

Neighbouring municipalities
The following municipalities, some with town status, border Warstein (clockwise, beginning in the north): Anröchte, Rüthen (town), Bestwig, Meschede (town), Arnsberg (town), Möhnesee, Bad Sassendorf. Of these, Bestwig and Meschede are in the district of Hochsauerlandkreis, on Warstein's (and, thus, Soest district's) southern border.

Subdivisions
While named for the main settled portion within its  total area, the town can be roughly divided into the following subdivisions:

History

Warstein was first mentioned officially in 1072. Historians once thought Warstein was organized as an official town in 1276, In the Middle Ages Warstein was part of the Hanseatic League, a trade association for guilds, a very important international trading association at that time. A fire in 1802 destroyed a significant portion of the town. After that the town centre was moved to the Wester brook. In 1844 the Amt Warstein was founded. In 1975 Warstein and the other eight independent villages merged to form the new borough of Warstein.

The decrease of population in Warstein since 1998:
1998: 29,102
1999: 29,084
2000: 29,028
2001: 29,007
2002: 29,012
2003: 28,762
2004: 28,629

List of mayors
1999–2004: Georg Juraschka (SPD)
2004–2015: Manfred Gödde (BG)
2015–incumbent: Thomas Schöne (CDU)

International relations

Warstein is twinned with:
 Saint-Pol-sur-Ternoise, France - twinned in 1964
 Wurzen, Saxony, Germany - twinned 3 October 1990
 Hebden Royd, United Kingdom - twinned November 1995
 Pietrapaola, Italy - an official friendship since 2001

Economy

The largest employer in Warstein is the Warsteiner brewery, founded in 1753. It is one of the largest breweries in Germany. Second largest employer is steel mill operator Siepmann-Werke, founded in 1891. In addition to its mills, the overall Siepmann Group head office is located in Warstein.

Notable people
Friedhelm Hillebrand (born 1940), engineer
Karl-Werner Schulte (born 1946), professor
Hugo Siepmann (1868-1950), industrialist
Emil Siepmann (1863-1950), industrialist an namesake of Emil-Siepmann-Strasse

Literature
Heppekausen, Wolfgang; Clewing, Christian: Warstein: Bilder einer sauerländischen Stadt. Selbstverlag, Warstein 2001.  
Gerte, Franz im Auftrag der Volkshochschule Möhne-Lippe: Wie war das?: Belecke 1923–1948. Selbstverlag, Belecke 2001. 
Bamberg, Fritz: Die neue Stadt Warstein in alten Ansichten. Europäische Bibliothek, Zaltbommel 1986.  
Bender, Josef: Geschichte der Stadt Warstein. Stein, Werl 1973.  
Sandgathe, Günther: Die Stadt Warstein im Dreissigjährigen Krieg. Selbstverlag, Warstein 1971.

References

External links

Official site 
Warsteiner brewery homepage 

Towns in North Rhine-Westphalia
Soest (district)
Members of the Hanseatic League